Peter Brand may refer to:

 Peter Brand (British politician) (born 1947), British general practitioner and  politician
 Peter J. Brand (born 1967), Canadian Egyptologist 
 Peter Wilhelm Brand (1900–1978), German politician
 Peter Brand, fictional character in the film Moneyball